William Matthew Acton (August 30, 1876 – February 16, 1957) was an American lawyer and politician.

Acton was born in Vermilion County, Illinois. He studied at Greer College in Hoopeston, Illinois and at the Danville Business College in Danville, Illinois. Acton was admitted to the Illinois bar in 1899 and practiced law in Danville. Acton served in the Illinois Senate from 1905 to 1909 and was a Republican. Acton died from a heart attack at his home in Danville, Illinois.

Notes

External links

1876 births
1957 deaths
People from Danville, Illinois
Illinois lawyers
Republican Party Illinois state senators